Minuscule 159 (in the Gregory-Aland numbering), ε 113 (Soden), is a Greek minuscule manuscript of the New Testament, on parchment, dated to 1121 (?). It has marginalia.

Description 

The codex contains a complete text of the four Gospels on 203 leaves (size 26.3 cm by 20.6 cm). The text is written in two columns per page, in 25 lines per page. The leaves 1-184 are from parchment, the leaves 185-203 are paper. The parchment is dick, ink is brown-black, the large initial letters under lines.

There is also a division according to the smaller Ammonian Sections (in Mark 240, the last section in 16:19), with references to the Eusebian Canons (written below Ammonian Section numbers).

It contains also Lectionary markings at the margin (for liturgical use) and subscriptions at the end of each Gospel.

Text 
The Greek text of the codex is a representative of the Byzantine text-type. Hermann von Soden classified it to the textual family Kx. Aland placed it in Category V.
According to the Claremont Profile Method it belongs to the textual cluster M159.

History 

The manuscript was housed at the Barberini Palace, founded by the Cardinal, Francis II.

It was examined and described by Birch (about 1782) and Scholz. C. R. Gregory saw it in 1886.

It is currently housed at the Vatican Library (Barb. gr. 482), at Rome.

See also 

 List of New Testament minuscules
 Biblical manuscript
 Textual criticism

References

Further reading

External links 

 Minuscule 159 at the DigiVatLib

Greek New Testament minuscules
12th-century biblical manuscripts
Manuscripts of the Vatican Library